Franko Burraj (born 19 August 1998) is an Albanian sprinter specialising in the 400 metres. He represented his country at one outdoor and one indoor European Championships. He currently holds the Albanian records in the 400 metres both indoors and out.

International competitions

Personal bests
Outdoor
200 metres – 21.74 (-0.1 m/s, Bar 2018)
400 metres – 46.16 (Oran 2022) NR
Indoor
400 metres – 46.83 (Istanbul 2020) NR

References

1998 births
Living people
Albanian male sprinters
Mediterranean Games competitors for Albania
Athletes (track and field) at the 2022 Mediterranean Games
21st-century Albanian people